Al-Sukhnah may refer to:
 Al-Sukhnah, Jordan
 Al-Sukhnah, Syria
 As Sukhnah District in Yemen